Verila Mountain is a minor range in Western Bulgaria extending 20 km in northwest–southeast direction between Vitosha and Rila Mountains and 12 km wide.  Its summit Golyam Debelets Peak rises to 1415 m.

Honours
Verila Glacier on Livingston Island in the South Shetland Islands, Antarctica is named after Verila Mountain.

References

External links
Arid Verila (in Bulgarian)

Mountain ranges of Bulgaria
Landforms of Sofia Province
Landforms of Pernik Province
Landforms of Kyustendil Province
Rhodope mountain range